BurgerTime World Tour is a platform game in the BurgerTime series, developed by Frozen Codebase and digitally published by MonkeyPaw Games for Xbox 360, PlayStation 3, and Wii in 2011-2012. On April 30, 2014, the game was delisted from the Xbox Live and WiiWare digital storefronts due to an expiring license between publisher MonkeyPaw Games and IP owner G-Mode.

Reception

The PlayStation 3 and Xbox 360 versions received "mixed" reviews, while the Wii version received "unfavorable" reviews, according to the review aggregation website Metacritic.

References

External links
 

2011 video games
Cancelled Windows games
Delisted digital-only games
MonkeyPaw Games games
Platform games
PlayStation 3 games
PlayStation Network games
Video games about food and drink
Video games developed in the United States
Video games with 2.5D graphics
Wii games
WiiWare games
Xbox 360 games
Xbox Live Arcade games